Zhi-Gin Andreas Lam (born 4 June 1991) is a German professional footballer who plays as a full-back or midfielder for Oberliga Hamburg club TuS Dassendorf.

Early life 
Lam was born in Hamburg, Germany to a Chinese father from Hong Kong and a German mother. His father emigrated to Hamburg in the 1980s. Lam has three elder sisters. When he was young, he often went back to Hong Kong with his family for summer holidays and played football in Sheung Shui.

Club career

Hamburger SV 
Lam began his career with the youth club for Hamburger SV in 2005 and in 2010 became an active player in the reserve team, Hamburger SV II, where he developed under manager Rodolfo Cardoso. In the 2011–12 season, after the dismissal of first-team coach Michael Oenning on 19 September 2011, Rodolfo was appointed the interim coach of the first team and started Lam (in Rodolfo's first game at the helm of HSV) against VfB Stuttgart on 23 September 2011. Cardoso's decision to start Lam proved to be a good one, as Lam was widely praised in his debut, with HSV sporting director Frank Arnesen saying, "He has done fantastically, [he] was totally relaxed. That was a real dream debut."

On 15 September 2013, he scored his first professional goal in the away league match against Borussia Dortmund. However, his goal could not save his team from losing 6–2.

Greuther Fürth 
On 5 June 2014, he signed a three-year contract with 2. Bundesliga side Greuther Fürth until 2017. The transfer fee is believed be about €200,000.

Kitchee 
On 2 July 2016, Hong Kong Premier League club Kitchee announced that Lam would join the club. At the conclusion of the 2017–18 season, he declined to sign a new contract in order to pursue opportunities in Germany.

R&F 
On 9 August 2018, Lam signed with another Hong Kong team R&F, a feeder team of Guangzhou R&F. He scored seven goals in 29 league matches during his spell at the club. On 14 October 2020, Lam left the club after his club's withdrawal from the HKPL in the new season.

TuS Dassendorf 
In January 2021, Oberliga Hamburg club TuS Dassendorf announced that Lam would join the club. He signed a contract until 2024.

Style of play 
Hamburger SV coach Rodolfo Cardoso described Lam as a courageous player, unafraid to claim the ball and "a very intelligent player...[who] can play anywhere."

Career statistics

Honours
Kitchee
Hong Kong Premier League: 2016–17, 2017–18
Hong Kong Senior Shield: 2016–17
Hong Kong FA Cup: 2016–17, 2017–18
Hong Kong Sapling Cup: 2017–18

References

External links 
 
 
 
 

1991 births
Footballers from Hamburg
Living people
German footballers
Association football defenders
Association football midfielders
Regionalliga players
Bundesliga players
2. Bundesliga players
Hong Kong Premier League players
Hamburger SV players
Hamburger SV II players
SpVgg Greuther Fürth players
German expatriate footballers
Kitchee SC players
R&F (Hong Kong) players
TuS Dassendorf players
German people of Hong Kong descent
German sportspeople of Chinese descent